Reggie Grimes II is an American football defensive end who currently plays for the Oklahoma Sooners.

Early life and high school
Grimes grew up in Antioch, Tennessee and initially attended Mount Juliet High School. He transferred to Ravenwood High School prior to his senior year after his father was hired to teach and coach football at the school. Grimes was rated a five-star recruit and committed to play college football at Oklahoma over offers from Alabama, Florida State, South Carolina, Tennessee and Vanderbilt.

College career
Grimes played in eight games during his freshman season at Oklahoma and made six tackles with one sack. He played in all 12 of the Sooners' games with five starts as a sophomore and finished the season with 18 tackles with two sacks and two forced fumbles. Grimes was named a starter at defensive end entering his junior season.

Personal life
Grimes' father, Reggie Grimes, played defensive tackle at Alabama.

References

External links
 Oklahoma Sooners bio

Living people
American football defensive ends
Players of American football from Tennessee
Oklahoma Sooners football players
Year of birth missing (living people)